Darnay Darius Robert Holmes (born June 23, 1998) is an American football cornerback for the New York Giants of the National Football League (NFL). He played college football at UCLA. His father, Darick Holmes, played in the NFL from 1995 to 1999.

Early years
Holmes attended Calabasas High School in Calabasas, California. He led the Coyotes to their first California Interscholastic Federation (CIF) title after scoring five touchdowns on offense, defense and special teams in a 42–3 win over Palos Verdes. Holmes played in the 2017 U.S. Army All-American Bowl. A five-star recruit, he committed to the University of California, Los Angeles (UCLA) to play college football.

College career
After an early enrollment to participate in the spring game, Holmes played for the Bruins from 2017 to 2019. He became a starter his freshman year and started 33 of the 35 games he played in. After the 2019 season, he entered the 2020 NFL Draft. He finished his career with 120 tackles, eight interceptions, and two touchdowns.

Professional career 

Holmes was selected by the New York Giants with the 110th pick in the fourth round of the 2020 NFL Draft.

In Week 13 against the Seattle Seahawks, Holmes recorded his first career interception off a pass thrown by Russell Wilson during the 17–12 win.

On November 30, 2021, Holmes was placed on the injured reserve list after suffering a rib injury after intercepting Eagles quarterback Jalen Hurts.

References

External links
New York Giants bio
UCLA Bruins bio

1998 births
Living people
Players of American football from Pasadena, California
American football cornerbacks
UCLA Bruins football players
New York Giants players